Laphria astur is a species of robber flies in the family Asilidae.

References

astur
Articles created by Qbugbot
Insects described in 1877